{{Speciesbox
| image = 
| image_caption = 
| taxon = Curveulima aupouria
| authority = Powell, 1937
| synonyms_ref = 
| synonyms = 
 Balcis aupouria  Powell, 1937 
}}Curveulima aupouria'' is a species of sea snail, a marine gastropod mollusk in the family Eulimidae.

References

External links
 To World Register of Marine Species

Eulimidae
Gastropods described in 1937